Roberto Lopes Nascimento or simply Roberto Lopes (born 16 August 1983 in Fortaleza), is a Brazilian defensive midfielder who currently plays for Serrano.

References

 http://www.serranofootball.club/site/futebol-profissional/atletas

External links
 CBF
 Guardian Stats Centre
 zerozero.pt
 sambafoot
 diretodacolina.wordpress.com
 crvascodagama.com

1983 births
Living people
Brazilian footballers
Brazilian expatriate footballers
Esporte Clube Vitória players
Ceará Sporting Club players
Fortaleza Esporte Clube players
Londrina Esporte Clube players
Campinense Clube players
Clube Náutico Capibaribe players
Madureira Esporte Clube players
CR Vasco da Gama players
Boavista Sport Club players
Brazilian expatriate sportspeople in the United Arab Emirates
Duque de Caxias Futebol Clube players
Clube de Regatas Brasil players
Association football midfielders
Sportspeople from Fortaleza